Jules Cuttoli (23 September 1871 – 29 September 1942) was a French politician.

Cuttoli was born in Algiers, Algeria.  He represented the Radical Party in the Chamber of Deputies from 1928 to 1936.

References

1871 births
1942 deaths
People from Algiers
People of French Algeria
Pieds-Noirs
Radical Party (France) politicians
Members of the 14th Chamber of Deputies of the French Third Republic
Members of the 15th Chamber of Deputies of the French Third Republic